Supercinema: Film-Philosophy for the Digital Age is a 2013 film-philosophy academic textbook by William Brown, Senior Lecturer in Film, and Honorary Fellow at the Department of Media, Culture and Language at the School of Arts at the University of Roehampton, London, United Kingdom.

Production 
The book was published by Berghahn Books in 2013.

Synopsis 
Supercinema combines philosophy of film, film theory, and psychology of film with scientific principles to fundamentally attempt to explain a deeper reality. The book delves into cognitive aspects of a hidden, potentially profound meaning behind the fabric of the film medium. And that analogue cinema is Clark Kent hiding Supercinema. And that Supercinema will take us into a new realm of cinema and what it can do.

Supercinema discusses convergent digital cinema. And that total cinema would involve no editing and little meaningful narrative. And would include single-take films and long-take films, and that single shots allow us to rethink perspective, and reconceptualize the frame.

Brown implies that there is an imminent new age of cinema coming, Supercinema.

Critical reception and influence 
The book has been described as "challenging" by Francesco Sticchi. 

The concepts put forward in the book are further advanced in Paul Virilio's 2016 book Drone Age Cinema.

References 

2013 non-fiction books
Philosophy books
Berghahn Books books

External links 

 Publisher's official webpage